Pope Cyril IV of Alexandria (Abba Kyrillos IV), Coptic: Ⲡⲁⲡⲁ Ⲁⲃⲃⲁ Ⲕⲩⲣⲓⲗⲗⲟⲩ ⲇ̅ 110th Pope of Alexandria & Patriarch of the See of St. Mark. He was born David (Daoud) in 1816. Despite his relatively short papacy, he is regarded as the "Father of Reform" of the Coptic Orthodox Church in modern times. He is credited for establishing a great printing house and printing many Church books.

While abbot of the Monastery of Saint Anthony, he was sent to Ethiopia at the request of Peter VII to mediate between Abouna Salama and his opponents in the Ethiopian Church, as well as "prevent the sympathies for the Catholic missionaries and their teaching from increasing further." While he was in Ethiopia, the Patriarch died. The former Ichege Gebre Mariam, who was in Cairo to press for the Ethiopian rights to the convent in Jerusalem, used this opportunity to exert pressure for his cause. As a result, the majority choice for Patriarch Peter's successor, Du'ad, was kept from taking his seat for two years.

As Patriarch, Cyril returned to Ethiopia at the request of viceroy Sa'id of Egypt, the first recorded visit by the head of the Coptic church to that country. Emperor Tewodros II, whom Trimingham described as "unable to conceive how a Christian prelate could consent to act as the envoy of a Muslim prince", received Pope Cyril unfavorably December 1856. Sven Rubenson records that when the Patriarch expressed an interest in reviewing the Emperor's army, Tewodros II suspected him of being a spy, and confined him with Abouna Salama to their house; only after the Ethiopian clergy intervened, were both men released. During a flare-up of tempers between the Abouna and Emperor in November of the following year, which led to the Abouna excommunicating Emperor Tewodros II, Patriarch Cyril lifted the interdict against the wishes of Abouna Salama; the Patriarch left Ethiopia soon after.

Notes

External links
 Coptic Orthodox Synaxarium (Book of Saints): The Departure of Pope Cyril IV (Kyrillos), 110th Pope of Alexandria

Cyril VI of Alexandria
Egypt–Ethiopia relations
Coptic Orthodox saints
19th-century Christian saints
1816 births
1861 deaths
People from Sohag Governorate